FPA may refer to:

Broadcasting and entertainment 
 Fancy Pants Adventures, an online game
 Feminist Porn Award, a Canadian adult film award
 First-person adventure, a video game genre
 Fundação Padre Anchieta, a Brazilian educational media foundation

Education 
 Florida Preparatory Academy, in Melbourne, Florida, United States

Foreign policy 
 Foreign policy analysis
 Foreign Policy Analysis (journal), a scholarly journal
 Foreign Policy Association, a US non-governmental organization

Government bodies 
 Fertilizer and Pesticide Authority, in the Philippines
 First Peoples' Assembly, Victoria, Australia
 Fuerzas de Policia Armada, the former Spanish Armed Police
 Kela (Finnish institution) ( - FPA), in Finland

Law 
 Federal Power Act, in the United States
 Flag Protection Act, in the United States
 Former Presidents Act, in the United States

Professional and trade organizations 
 Financial Planning Association, in the United States
 Fire Protection Association, in the United Kingdom
 Florida Philosophical Association, in the United States
 Food Products Association, in the United States

Science and technology 
 Fibrinopeptide A, a compound in coagulation
 Floating Point Accelerator, a math coprocessor for early ARM processors
 Flower pollination algorithm
 Focal-plane array
 Focal-plane array (radio astronomy)
 Function point analysis

Sport 
 Formula Palmer Audi, a form of motor racing
 Paraguayan Athletics Federation

Other uses
 Cairo Foreign Press Association, in Egypt
 Family Planning Association, a British sexual health charity
 The Family Planning Association of Hong Kong
 Flygprestanda, a Swedish aviation company
 Fort Abbas railway station, in Pakistan
 Franklin P. Adams (1881–1960), American columnist and poet who used F.P.A. as a nom-de-plume
 Facility Planning Area, sewer planning in the United States